NGC 4800 is an isolated spiral galaxy in the constellation Canes Venatici, located at a distance of  from the Milky Way. It was discovered by William Herschel on April 1, 1788. The morphological classification of this galaxy is SA(rs)b, indicating a spiral galaxy with no visual bar at the nucleus (SA), an incomplete ring structure (rs), and moderately-tightly wound spiral arms (b). The galactic plane is inclined to the line of sight by an angle of 43°, and the long axis is oriented along a position angle of 25°. There is a weak bar structure at the nucleus that is visible in the infrared.

The galaxy has a low-luminosity active galactic nucleus with an HII region at the core. The circumnuclear zone contains a double ring structure of "ultra-compact nuclear rings"; the inner ring has a radius of 30 pc and the outer ring's radius is about 130 pc.

References

External links
 

Unbarred spiral galaxies
Canes Venatici
4800
043931